Orthocaine is a local anesthetic. Developed in the 1890s, it was found to be of limited use due to its low solubility in water, but it has been used in powdered form to dust onto painful wounds.

References

Local anesthetics
Benzoate esters
Anilines
Phenols